Lovyagin is a rural locality (a khutor) in Beryozovskoye Rural Settlement, Danilovsky District, Volgograd Oblast, Russia. The population was 201 as of 2010.

Geography 
Lovyagin is located in forest steppe, on the left bank of the Medveditsa River, 23 km north of Danilovka (the district's administrative centre) by road. Bobry is the nearest rural locality.

References 

Rural localities in Danilovsky District, Volgograd Oblast